The 2021 Rally Monza (also known as FORUM8 ACI Rally Monza 2021) was a motor racing event for rally cars that held over four days between 18 and 21 November 2021. It marked the forty-second running of Monza Rally Show and was the twelfth and final round of the 2021 World Rally Championship, World Rally Championship-2, World Rally Championship-3. The event was based in the famous Autodromo Nazionale di Monza circuit near Milan, where the Italian Grand Prix was held.

Sébastien Ogier and Julien Ingrassia were the defending rally winners. Their team, Toyota Gazoo Racing WRT, were the defending manufacturers' winners. Mads Østberg and Torstein Eriksen were the defending winners in the WRC-2 category. Andreas Mikkelsen and Anders Jæger-Amland weer the defending winners in the WRC-3 category, but they did not defend their title as Mikkelsen was competing in the WRC-2 category for Toksport WRT.

Ogier and Ingrassia successfully defended their titles. Their team, Toyota Gazoo Racing WRT, successfully defended their titles. The result saw them confirm the world titles. In the World Rally Championship-2 category, Jari Huttunen and Mikko Lukka won the event, while Torstein Eriksen confirmed to win the WRC-2 co-driver title. In the World Rally Championship-3 category, Andrea Crugnola and Pietro Ometto won the rally. Meanwhile, Yohan Rossel and Maciej Szczepaniak took the driver's and co-driver's title in the class respectively.

Background

Championship standings prior to the event
Reigning World Champions Sébastien Ogier and Julien Ingrassia entered the round with a seventeen-point lead over Elfyn Evans and Scott Martin. Thierry Neuville and Martijn Wydaeghe were third, a further twenty-eight points behind. In the World Rally Championship for Manufacturers, Toyota Gazoo Racing WRT held a massive forty-seven-point lead over defending manufacturers' champions Hyundai Shell Mobis WRT, followed by M-Sport Ford WRT.

In the World Rally Championship-2 standings, newly-crowned champion Andreas Mikkelsen led Mads Østberg in the drivers' championship, with Marco Bulacia Wilkinson in third. In the co-drivers' championship Torstein Eriksen held a twenty-two-point lead over Marcelo Der Ohannesian, with Ola Fløene in third.

In the World Rally Championship-3 standings, Yohan Rossel led Kajetan Kajetanowicz by twelve points in the drivers' championship, with Emil Lindholm in third. In the co-drivers' championship, newly-crowned champion Maciek Szczepaniak held a thirteen-six-point lead over Alexandre Coria, with Ross Whittock in third.

Entry list
The following crews entered the rally. The event opened to crews competing in the World Rally Championship, its support categories, the World Rally Championship-2 and World Rally Championship-3, and privateer entries that were not registered to score points in any championship. Ten entries for the World Rally Championship were received, as were four in the World Rally Championship-2 and twenty-one in the World Rally Championship-3.

Route
The first and second leg of action are set to take place both in stages inside the Autodromo Nazionale di Monza and in public stages north of Bergamo in the foothills of the Alps, while the third leg, including the Power Stage, will take place solely inside the circuit.

Itinerary
All dates and times are CEST (UTC+2).

Report

World Rally Cars

Classification

Special stages

Championship standings
Bold text indicates 2021 World Champions.

World Rally Championship-2

Classification

Special stages

Championship standings
Bold text indicates 2021 World Champions.

World Rally Championship-3

Classification

Special stages

Championship standings
Bold text indicates 2021 World Champions.

Notes

References

External links

  
 2021 Rally Monza at eWRC-results.com
 The official website of the World Rally Championship

Italy
2021 in Italian motorsport
November 2021 sports events in Italy
2021